The 1908 Colorado gubernatorial election was held on November 3, 1908. Democratic nominee John F. Shafroth defeated Republican nominee Jesse Fuller McDonald with 49.41% of the vote.

General election

Candidates
Major party candidates
John F. Shafroth, Democratic
Jesse Fuller McDonald, Republican

Other candidates
Henry Clay Darrah, Socialist
H. L. Murray, Prohibition

Results

References

1908
Colorado
Gubernatorial